Tracy-Ann Oberman (born Tracy Anne Oberman; 25 August 1966) is an English actress, playwright and  narrator. She is known for roles including Chrissie Watts in the BBC soap opera EastEnders (2004–2005) and Valerie Lewis or "Auntie Val" in the Channel 4 sitcom Friday Night Dinner (2011–2020).

Following training at the Central School of Speech and Drama in London, Oberman spent four years with the Royal Shakespeare Company, before joining the National Theatre. Her theatrical experience includes appearing with Kenneth Branagh in David Mamet's Edmond (2003) and a run in the West End revival of Boeing-Boeing (2007–2008). She appeared in a production of Earthquakes in London in its 2011 run as Sarah Sullivan. Oberman has performed in more than 600 radio plays since the mid-1990s.

Oberman's TV credits have also included Doctor Who, Mistresses, Robin Hood, and Doctors. Before EastEnders, Oberman appeared in a variety of television programmes including Casualty (1997–1998), Kiss Me Kate (1998), and The Bill (2000), and carved out a comedic niche with leading roles in Bob Martin (2000–2001), Lenny Henry In Pieces (2000–2003), Big Train (2002), and Toast of London (2013–2015). She had a recurring role in the penultimate and last series of procedural comedy-drama New Tricks (2014–2015) as Fiona Kennedy, a forensic pathologist. Oberman appeared in Tracey Ullman's Show and Tracey Breaks the News from 2016 to 2018.

Oberman has contributed to several radio sketch shows and, in 2008, co-authored with Diane Samuels the play 3 Sisters on Hope Street. In 2010, she wrote and starred alongside Catherine Tate in her BBC Radio 4 play Bette and Joan and Baby Jane and in 2012 wrote the BBC Radio 4 play Rock and Doris and Elizabeth. In 2015 she wrote and starred in the third part of her Hollywood Trilogy for BBC Radio 4, Mrs. Robinson, I Presume, alongside John Simm and Kevin Bishop. Oberman was a regular columnist for The Guardian newspaper during 2007, for which she is still an occasional contributor. She was a regular contributor to The Jewish Chronicle (2009–2017) and also contributes to Red magazine.

Early life and education
Oberman was born in Brent, Greater London, and is of Jewish background. She grew up in North London, attending Heathfield School for Girls, before going on to study Classics at Leeds University; however, after a year she moved to Manchester University to pursue drama. After graduating she was accepted into the Central School of Speech and Drama, where she trained as an actor. In 1991, Oberman studied for a term at the Moscow Art Theatre School as part of her training. Oberman has spoken of how her drive for professionalism was a result of her parents' initial concern with her career choice.

As she came from a strong legal background, her family "weren't wildly happy" about her desire to become an actress: "My parents were always making me watch Rumpole of the Bailey, going 'You see? It's just like acting, you make things up, you wear a wig and a funny outfit. Why not the law?' But I just always wanted to act, as far back as I remember." Her joining the Royal Shakespeare Company though, finally won her parents over. However, in a 2004 interview, Oberman noted that her father's death seven years earlier prevented his seeing the development of her career and her national success as an actor: "I've come a long way in my career since he died and I wish he was here to see it. He was a big EastEnders fan so I know he'd be very, very proud of me."

Acting

Theatre
After leaving the Central School of Speech and Drama, Oberman joined the Royal Shakespeare Company. In 1993 she took part in the RSC's award-winning production of Christopher Marlowe's Tamburlaine as "Olympia". This was followed by roles in The Changeling, as "Diaphanta", A Jovial Crew in the part of "Joan Cope", and The Beggar's Opera where she played Molly Brazen. In 1994 she completed her run at the RSC playing in Macbeth and A Christmas Carol.

After performing in several West End productions, Oberman played at the Royal National Theatre in Clifford Odets' Waiting for Lefty during 1999. This was followed by starring in School Play at the Soho Theatre. The play was lauded by The Guardian critic Michael Billington as a "remarkable" production,  praising Oberman for her successful portrayal of Miss Fay as "the teacher torn between her career and her pupil's potential".

In 2003, Oberman returned to the National in Edmond, playing opposite Kenneth Branagh. Her role as wife to Branagh's title character was well received by some critics, Norman Miller in a BBC News review commended Oberman for making a particular "impression".

That year also saw her star in Hello and Goodbye at the Southwark Playhouse.  According to Fiona Mountford in The Evening Standard, the production was "given the outing of its life by" Oberman and her co-star, Zubin Varla. The review in The British Theatre Guide was similarly positive, praising Oberman who "rages away" in the role of "Hester", and delivers "one of the best performances in town".

She took a couple of years away from acting with the birth of her daughter in August 2006. At the end of 2007 she returned full-time to work in the West End revival of Boeing-Boeing, playing "Gretchen" opposite Jean Marsh and Jennifer Ellison.

In July 2008 Oberman  starred in the world premiere of On the Rocks as Frieda Lawrence, wife of novelist D. H. Lawrence. The play, by Amy Rosenthal, follows the marriage of the Lawrences during one idyllic summer in 1916, most reviews following the line taken by Benedict Nightingale of The Times in declaring Oberman to have given a "fine performance... as a gloriously sensual, blowsily defiant Frieda".

In 2011, she played in the touring production of Earthquakes in London by Mike Bartlett which was an updated version of the National Theatre / Headlongs production earlier that year.

In December 2012 Oberman returned to the stage at the Hampstead Theatre in the premiere of Old Money by Sarah Wooley directed by Terry Johnson. In 2015, Oberman played the role of Isabella Blow in the play McQueen, at the St James Theatre, London.

Radio

Oberman has appeared in over 600 radio plays. She has acted in radio drama and radio comedy, appearing regularly on BBC Radio 4 as a member of the station's unofficial "repertory" company, including; The Way It Is (1998–2001), the leading role in The Attractive Young Rabbi (1999–2002), The Sunday Format (1999–2004), and Getting Nowhere Fast.

At the end of 2009, Oberman returned to radio to star in "Gregory Evans’ mind-boggling play" Shirleymander for Radio 4, with reviewer Moira Petty describing Oberman's turn as Dame Shirley Porter as "freakishly real". In 2010, Oberman remained with the radio medium, performing opposite Catherine Tate.

Television and EastEnders
Her first major television role was in 1997 when she was cast as Zoe Gerrard, a security officer in the medical drama Casualty.

In 1998, she joined the cast of Comedy Nation, a satirical sketch show that featured some of Britain's leading up-and-coming comedians, such as Sacha Baron Cohen, Julian Barratt, and Robert Webb. This was followed by an assortment of parts in various television productions, including a performance in a two-part story for the police serial The Bill in 2000.

That year Oberman was cast as series regular "Beverly Jordan" opposite Michael Barrymore in Bob Martin, and became a lead performer in Lenny Henry in Pieces, starring actor/comedian Lenny Henry, which ran until 2003. In 2002 Oberman joined the second and final series of the sketch show Big Train, performing beside comedians Simon Pegg and Catherine Tate.

The following year saw the Harringham Harker move from radio to television as part of BBC 2's Autumn line-up alongside The Office and Coupling, with Oberman continuing in her role as lead and writer.

She has appeared in many other TV programmes, including; The Way It Is (2000), Bob Martin (2000–2001) opposite Michael Barrymore, Lenny Henry in Pieces (2000–2001), Big Train (2002), SuperTex (2003) and in episodes of Doctors, The Last Detective, Where the Heart Is, The Bill, Casualty. She played the previously unseen character of Marion in a special half-hour episode of the monologue series Marion and Geoff in 2001.

In 2004, Oberman moved away from comedy to join the BBC soap opera EastEnders, after she was cast as Chrissie Watts, the second wife of "one of the best-loved villains in soap history", "Dirty" Den Watts. It was a role she played for almost two years, and which brought her public recognition. Before long, Oberman would become one of the leading regulars of the show and at the forefront of several storylines. At the time, though, television critics pointed to Oberman's extensive theatrical background and questioned: "why would an actress with such pedigree agree to be in EastEnders?" Oberman has continuously responded by placing the move in the context of her professional exposure, noting her position as a "jobbing actress" at the time and her desire to return to drama after her recent comedic roles. Making her debut on 29 April, Oberman was viewed as an "overnight success" in the role of Chrissie, with Amy Raphael of The Telegraph feeling that the actress "easily upstaged the rest of the cast with her three-dimensional portrayal of a classic soap bitch". In 2005, "18 million people" watched her character kill Den in a fit of rage to mark the 20th anniversary of EastEnders, with Oberman "anchoring" the show's success that year and dominating drama as Chrissie, who "packed into a year what most soap characters do in three." Commenting on her role two years after she left the show, Oberman concluded:

Oberman described her time on EastEnders as "hectic", leading her to depart the show during December 2005. However, the role of Chrissie has remained a defining point of her career. In a recent interview, Oberman remarked: "Chrissie was such a wonderful character and the show was watched by so many people, especially the murder of Den, that it opened up doors that I never thought it would. I had some fantastic offers when I left, there were film and theatre... it was wonderful for me; EastEnders is a very good calling card." Oberman has also recently declared her willingness to return to the part of Chrissie and EastEnders, even if only to provide a resolution for the character.

Before leaving EastEnders, Oberman provided the voice of "Miss Dickson" in the adult-themed cartoon Bromwell High for Channel Four.

It was also announced that Oberman would guest star in the second series of the revived Doctor Who, playing the character of Yvonne Hartman, whom she described as "a sophisticated sort of baddie", with a BBC source declaring Oberman "perfect to play evil Yvonne and will be brilliant at terrorising the next generation of viewers". The two-part series finale entitled "Army of Ghosts" and "Doomsday", aired in July 2006, attracting audiences of 8.19 million and 8.22 million respectively. Oberman extols her appearance in Doctor Who as a career highlight, being a "confessed Whovian" or fan of the show: "Some people, their life's ambition is to walk in and see Queen Vic, mine was to see a Tardis and a sonic screwdriver... and a Dalek!"

In 2006, Oberman signed on to the BBC One six-part comedy-drama series Sorted as series regular Amy, alongside Will Mellor. In 2008, she made a brief return to TV in the CBBC production Summerhill.

In 2009, Oberman made several guest-starring roles in BBC television programmes, beginning with Mistresses in which she played the owner of a sex-toy company. This was followed by a part in the BBC One drama Robin Hood, as the wife of the Sheriff of York. In September, Oberman returned to the medical series Doctors five years after first appearing in the programme, undertaking the role of 'black widow' Cathy Harley. Oberman had a part in the "web thriller" Girl Number 9, which she playfully described as "the first Twitter-related drama that there's ever been!" Penned by James Moran, the adult-themed online horror series was headlined as a "big step forward" for British web drama, with Oberman playing the lead detective "Lyndon" beside Gareth David-Lloyd.

From 2011 to 2020 Oberman played Auntie Val in the Channel 4 sitcom Friday Night Dinner and between 2012 and 2015, Oberman played Mrs. Purchase in Matt Berry and Arthur Mathew's comedy, Toast of London.

In May–July 2013, Oberman filmed the 6 part series Give Out Girls for Sky Living/Big Talk productions as Debbie, the head of Hot Staff promotions girls.

In January 2014, Oberman played the character, Audrey MacMurray, in the final episode of the second series of Father Brown which was shown on BBC One in their afternoon schedule and later in the evening on BBC Two in the evening. Also that year, she appeared in Crims for BBC Three playing 'hard as nails' Governor Riley.

New Tricks, the high ratings BBC drama, saw her appear regularly as forensic anthropologist-Fiona Kennedy (series 11 and 12).

Oberman kept up her string of TV guest appearances with a role in the drama Tracy Beaker Returns, playing "Terrie Fender", a travel agent and con artist. She also joined the junior spy series M.I. High, as the "Grand Mistress". Appearing on the chat show, The Wright Stuff, Oberman revealed that she undertook the part because M. I. High was her nephew's favourite programme, but also added that she was a fan herself, describing it as a "junior version of Spooks.

Oberman has appeared in two of Tracey Ullman series; Tracey Breaks the News and Tracey Ullman's Show, a BBC One production between 2016 and 2018.

Most recently, she has appeared as Rebecca in Netflix series After Life alongside Ricky Gervais, as Helen Chalmers in Sky One comedy-drama Code 404 and as Ritchie’s agent, Carol Carter, in Channel 4 drama It's a Sin.

Writing
From 2006 to 2007, Oberman was a regular columnist for The Guardian newspaper. From 2009–2017, she was a regular columnist for The Jewish Chronicle.

Oberman wrote and performed in her first BBC Radio 4 play which went out to great critical acclaim on 29 April 2010. Catherine Tate played Bette Davis and Oberman herself (after persuasion by the producer) played Joan Crawford, with Lorelei King as Hedda Hopper. The play was chosen as Pick of The Week by Gillian Reynolds, and garnered a huge amount of press interest due to the subject matter, and it being Oberman's first radio play.

She followed this up three weeks later by writing and performing her own BBC Radio 4 short story called "Girl on an Island" as part of a series of three called Actors' Voices (along with Anna Massey and James Dreyfus).

On 16 October 2012 BBC Radio 4 broadcast her second radio play Rock and Doris and Elizabeth (starring Frances Barber and Jonathan Hyde as Rock Hudson and Doris Day, and Oberman as Elizabeth Taylor) to very positive feedback. It followed Rock Hudson's AIDS scandal hitting the world's media after appearing on his old friend Doris Day's cable network show. Radio Drama Review Online described it as "poignant and utterly spellbinding".

In December 2020 BBC Radio 4 broadcast her play That Summer Of '67, a dramatisation concerning the production of the ground-breaking film Guess Who's Coming To Dinner.

She has also written comedy sketches and a sitcom for BBC Three, The Harringham Harker.

Oberman co-wrote 3 Sisters on Hope Street with playwright and neighbour Diane Samuels. The play, published in 2008, is a reinterpretation of Chekhov's The Three Sisters, transferring events to Liverpool after the Second World War, and re-casting the Pozorov sisters as three Jewish Englishwomen.

Another radio play written by Oberman was Mrs Robinson, I Presume for BBC Radio 4 which told the story of how the film The Graduate was produced.

Other work
Oberman has appeared as a guest reviewer on an episode of Film 2007 with Jonathan Ross, as a contestant on a Doctor Who special of The Weakest Linkshe was the second one voted offand as a special guest performer in Tim Crouch's two-hander The Oak Tree at the Soho Theatre. In 2004 she came a close second place on Celebrity Mastermind, the specialist subject being The Imperial Roman Family Augustus to Claudius Caesar.

She appeared on Test the Nation.

In September 2005 she was a guest on Friday Night with Jonathan Ross. In 2006 she was the guest on Nigel Slater's A Taste of My Life and in 2007 Oberman appeared on BBC One's Saturday Kitchen. She has featured in the BBC Radio 4 show Rudy's Rare Records.

Oberman is also known for her narration of advertisements and documentaries such as Five's I'm A Celebrity: Who Won! and Channel 4's ’’Escape to the Chateau’’.

She is featured in the video for The Yeah You's debut single "15 Minutes", hosting her fictional chat show, interviewing the rock band.

She made it through to the quarter-finals of Celebrity MasterChef in 2009. She is a regular panellist on The Wright Stuff.

Oberman hosted the "2009 International Hall of Fame Awards" at the International Women's Forum World Leadership Conference in Miami, 7–9 October.

In 2011 Oberman appeared in Born To Shine singing folk music and playing the guitar.

In 2012, Oberman was a judge, alongside Yiddish scholar, David Katz, on a Channel 4 reality series, Jewish Mum of the Year. Commenting, Maureen Lipman said "It's disgusting. It is very damaging, with anti-Semitism being what it is. Not to mention that being a Jewish mother is nothing like the way they portray it".  Former BBC chairman Michael Grade also criticised the programme, saying: "I don't know what it was supposed to be. They seemed to cram in every cliché in the book".

Oberman has narrated many documentaries on Channel 5.

She hosts the podcast Trolled with Tracy Ann Oberman, with past guests including Danny Baker, Rachel Riley, Dom Joly and more. Oberman has also appeared on other podcasts, including The QuaranTea Break Podcast with Simon Ward.

Views on Israel and antisemitism
Oberman has described Israel as "a country I love", has friends and family living there and has holidayed there throughout her life. In April 2012, and again in September 2014, she called on supporters of Israel to be more active in campaigning on Twitter. She resigned as a member of the Labour Party in 2016 due to its delay in concluding the disciplinary process of Ken Livingstone after he referred to Hitler "supporting Zionism" during his early years in power.

In February 2019, Oberman and Rachel Riley instructed a lawyer to take action against 70 individuals for tweets which they perceived to be either libellous or tantamount to harassment, related to their campaign against allegations of antisemitism in the Labour party. As a result, Riley and Oberman sued one person who had retweeted a link to an article which had accused Oberman and Riley of harassing a young Labour activist who had commented on accusations of antisemitism in the Labour Party. In May 2019, a High Court judge ruled that the article that was linked in the tweet was defamatory. In July 2020, Riley and Oberman dropped their joint libel suit and contributed towards the defendant's legal costs.

In late April 2019, Oberman was one of over 100 celebrities who signed a statement against a campaign advocating the boycotting of the 2019 Eurovision Song Contest which was held that year in Israel. In December 2019, Oberman spoke at a rally held by Campaign Against Antisemitism in Parliament Square, calling for solidarity with British Jews.

On 4 April 2021, Oberman falsely accused politician and academic Philip Proudfoot of antisemitism, claiming he had a Twitter "Jew Blocklist". On 26 April 2022, she issued a statement apologising for her inaccurate and "hurtful comments", noting that she would pay "substantial damages" to Proudfoot along with his legal costs.

Personal life
Oberman is Jewish, and has said that "Surprisingly, to me, it all came back to being Jewish. I say surprisingly because I spent most of my 20s and early 30s on a path that took me far from my religion". In December 2004, she married music producer Rob Cowan. In August 2006, she gave birth to their daughter.

Awards

Credits

Theatre

Radio and audio

Television

Film

Written

References

External links
 
 
 
 Tracy-Ann Oberman: To my great-grandmother, Fiddler on the Roof was documentary
 EastEnders actress Tracy-Ann Oberman: Now I am older I am determined

1966 births
Living people
20th-century English actresses
21st-century English actresses
Activists against antisemitism
Actresses from London
Alumni of the Royal Central School of Speech and Drama
Alumni of the University of Leeds
Alumni of the University of Manchester
British women columnists
Moscow Art Theatre School alumni
British Zionists
English columnists
English comedy writers
English dramatists and playwrights
English radio actresses
English Shakespearean actresses
English soap opera actresses
English television actresses
Jewish dramatists and playwrights
Jewish English actresses
People from the London Borough of Brent
Royal Shakespeare Company members